Flute In is the debut album by American jazz flautist Bobbi Humphrey, recorded in 1971 and released on the Blue Note label.

Reception
The Allmusic review by Andrew Hamilton awarded the album 4 stars, stating "Bobbi displays dexterity and power throughout her coming out, mainstream LP".

Track listing
 "Ain't No Sunshine" (Bill Withers) - 2:30
 "It's Too Late" (Carole King) - 3:05
 "The Sidewinder" (Lee Morgan) - 6:13
 "Sad Bag" (D. Griffin) - 5:05
 "Spanish Harlem" (Jerry Leiber, Phil Spector) - 3:45
 "Don't Knock My Funk" (W. Marcus Bey) - 4:36
 "Journey To Morocco" (Bey) - 8:19
 "Set Us Free" (Eddie Harris) - 5:45
Recorded at Rudy Van Gelder Studio, Englewood Cliffs, New Jersey on September 30 & October 1, 1971

Personnel
Bobbi Humphrey - flute
Lee Morgan - trumpet (tracks 3 & 5-8)
Billy Harper - tenor saxophone (tracks 3 & 5-8)
George Devens - vibes, marimba, percussion
Hank Jones (tracks 1, 4, 7 & 8), Frank Owens (tracks 2, 3, 5 & 6) - piano, electric piano
Gene Bertoncini - guitar
George Duvivier - bass (tracks 1, 4, 7 & 8)
Gordon Edwards - electric bass (tracks 2, 3, 5 & 6)
Jimmy Johnson (tracks 2, 3, 5 & 6), Idris Muhammad (tracks 1, 4, 7 & 8) - drums
Ray Armando - conga
Wade Marcus -  arranger

References 

Blue Note Records albums
Bobbi Humphrey albums
1971 debut albums
Albums recorded at Van Gelder Studio
Albums arranged by Wade Marcus
Albums produced by George Butler (record producer)